Built in 1998, the RDV Sportsplex was a multi-purpose sports and recreation facility that included RDV Athletic Club, RDV Ice Den, and nearly 100,000 square feet of Class A office/medical-use space occupied by tenants located in Orlando, Florida. The 365,000 square foot facility served as one of the most unique and comprehensive multi-purpose health and athletic facilities in the country and was home to the NBA's Orlando Magic practice facility and corporate offices until 2010.  

RDV Sportsplex was sold on December 13, 2022 to Genesis Health Clubs. Based in Wichita, Genesis Health Clubs came to the Central Florida market in June 2022 with the purchase of RDV sister facilities MVP Athletic Club-Brownwood and MVP Athletic Club-Spanish Springs in The Villages. RDV Sportsplex is now known as Genesis Health Clubs - Orlando Sportsplex and Genesis Ice Den respectively.

External links

Map: 

Sports venues in Orange County, Florida
Sports venues completed in 1998
College ice hockey venues in the United States
Maitland, Florida
1998 establishments in Florida
Ice hockey venues in Florida